Kurdistan conflict may refer to one of the following: 
Kurdish–Turkish conflict - between PKK and affiliated Kurdish organizations against Turkey from 1984
Iraqi–Kurdish conflict - a separatist struggle of Barzan tribe and later KDP and PUK in north Iraq from 1919 until 2003
Iranian-Kurdish conflict - from 1918
Syrian Kurdistan conflict - part of Syrian civil war (from 2012)